Tūqā-Tīmūr or Tūqāy-Tīmūr or Tuqa-Temür (also Toqa-Temür and Togai-Temür) was the thirteenth and perhaps youngest son of Jochi, the eldest son of Genghis Khan. He was a younger brother of Batu Khan and Berke Khan, the rulers of what came to be known as the Golden Horde.

Career

As Jochi's apparently youngest son of standing, Tuqa-Timur was perhaps deemed too young to attend the qurultai for the proclamation and enthronement of the great khan Ögedei in 1229. Instead, Tuqa-Timur remained behind in his father's ulus, apparently governing it during the absence of his older brothers at the assembly. When Batu Khan returned, Tuqa-Timur organized a three-day feast in his honor.

Tuqa-Timur subsequently received an ulus of his own from Batu, somewhere within the Left Wing (i.e., eastern portion) of Batu's possessions, that is to say east of the Ural Mountains and Ural River, and perhaps under the intermediate authority of another brother, Orda. Tuqa-Timur participated in Batu's Western Campaign, but does not seem to have played a very distinguished role in it; he is also credited with a leading role in campaigns against the Bashkirs and Alans. He was among the Jochid princes participating in the qurultai at which the great khan Güyük was formally proclaimed and enthroned, in 1246, Batu having refused to attend. After Batu's quriltai that resulted in the proclamation of Möngke as great khan in 1250, Berke and Tuqa-Timur escorted Möngke to Mongolia with an army, and were generously rewarded by the new great khan for their support. Tuqa-Timur appears to have survived Batu and to have died some time after Berke's accession as khan of the Golden Horde in 1257; it is presumed that he was already dead by 1267, when his son Urung-Timur received lands from the new khan Mengu-Timur. The Mongol prince ("tsarevich") Toktemir, who attacked Tver' in Russia in 1294/1295, is a distinct individual, bearing the same or similar name.

Following the example of his older brother Berke, Tuqa-Timur converted to Islam, sometime after Berke's conversion in 1251–1252. Unlike his brothers Batu, Orda, and Shiban, Tuqa-Timur does not appear to have headed an autonomous and lasting territorial polity, something brought up as a negative comparison in disputes between his descendants and those of Shiban in the late 14th century; the Shibanids argued that this made the Tuka-Timurids substantially inferior. Some of Tuqa-Timur's descendants appear to have remained in the Left Wing (eastern portion) of the Golden Horde, while others were settled in the Right Wing (western portion) when Khan Mengu-Timur gave the Crimea to Tuqa-Timur's son Urung-Timur.

Descendants

Apart from his involvement in the affairs of the Golden Horde and his actions as representative of his older brothers, Tuqa-Timur is important as the progenitor of some of the most prolific and historically significant lines of Jochid and Chinggisid descent. From the 1360s, Tuqa-Timur's descendants vied with those of his brother Shiban for possession of the throne of the Golden Horde, starting with the probable Tuqa-Timurid Ordu Malik, who overthrew the Shibanid Timur Khwaja in 1361. A Crimean branch of Tuqa-Timur's descendants furnished the beglerbeg Mamai with a succession of three puppet khans in 1361–1380. Several families descended from Tuqa-Timur ensconced themselves in the former Ulus of Jochi's eldest son Orda in the east, under Qara Noqai in 1360, then Urus Khan in 1369, and finally Tokhtamysh in 1379. The descendants of Urus and Tokhtamysh subsequently disputed possession of the Golden Horde mostly among themselves. Among the successor states of the Golden Horde, the khanates of Qasim, Kazan, Astrakhan, and the Crimean Khanate were all founded by princes descended from Tuqa-Timur. This was also the case with the Kazakh Khanate and, after 1599, the Khanate of Bukhara in Central Asia.

The following is a simplified line of descent to these rulers; generations start with Tuqa-Timur (as 0). For the sake of accuracy and consistency, the names, which are found in a bewildering and inconsistent number of variations, are given below in the Perso-Arabic orthography of the major genealogical sources, the Muʿizz al-ansāb and the Tawārīḫ-i guzīdah-i nuṣrat-nāmah, in the standard scholarly transcription used in English-language scholarship (e.g., Bosworth 1996).

0 Tūqā-Tīmūr (d. after 1257)
 1 Bāy-Timur
 2 Tūqānchar
 3 Sāsī
 4 Qarā Nūqāy of the Ulus of Orda 1360–1363
 4 Būchqāq
 5 Tughluq-Tīmūr of the Ulus of Orda 1363–? 
 4 Qutluq-Khwāja of the Ulus of Orda 1369
 3 Būrqūlāq
 4 Mubārak-Khwāja of the Ulus of Orda ?–1369 
 1 Bāyān
 2 Dānishmand
 3 Īl-Tūtār
 4 Ūrdū-Malik of the Golden Horde 1361
 3 Beg-Tūt
 4 Beg-Ṣūfī = ? Beg-Ṣūfī claimant in Crimea 1419–1421 (identification disputed)
 5 Sayyid-Aḥmad II claimant in Crimea 1432–1437, Podolia 1433–1452 (d. 1465?) (identification disputed)
 1 Ūrung-Tīmūr (Ūz-Tīmūr, Urungbāsh)
 2 Achiq
 3 Tāqtaq
 4 Tīmūr-Khwāja
 5 Bādiq
 6 Urūs of the Ulus of Orda 1369–1377, of the Golden Horde 1373, 1374–1375
 7 Qutlū-Būqā of the Ulus of Orda 1374–1375
 7 Tūqtāqiyā of the Ulus of Orda 1377
 8 Beg-Pūlād claimant in Crimea 1391–1392
 8 Anīka-Pūlād
 9 Aḥmad Girāy of the Kazakhs 1470–?
 10 Burundūq of the Kazakhs ?–1513
 7 Tīmūr-Malik of the Ulus of Orda 1377–1379
 7 Qūyūrchuq of the Golden Horde 1395–1397
 8 Barāq of the Ulus of Orda 1419–1421; of Sibir 1421–1426; of the Golden Horde 1423–1428
 9 Jānī-Beg Abū-Saʿīd of the Kazakhs 1470–after 1490 (the listing of ruling descendants in his line is selective and incomplete)
 10 Qāsim of the Kazakhs 1513–1521
 11 Ḥaqq-Nazar of the Kazakhs 1559–1580
 12 Dīn-Muḥammad (Tīnīm) of Tashkent (d. 1603)
 11 Muḥammad (Mamāsh) of the Kazakhs 1521–1522
 10 Adīk
 11 Ṭāhir of the Kazakhs 1522–1532
 11 Būydāsh of the Kazakhs 1532–1559
 11 Khwāja-Muḥammad (Qujāsh) Kazakh claimant 1535
 10 Usāq
 11 Pūlād Kazakh claimant 1537
 10 Ūsāk
 11 Būlākāy
 12 Bahādur of the Kazakhs 1652–1680
 12 Aychuwāq
 13 Irīsh
 14 Khwāja-Sulṭān
 15 Abu'l-Khayr Muḥammad of the Kazakh Lesser Jüz 1718–1748
 16 Nūr-ʿAlī of the Kazakh Lesser Jüz 1748–1786 (d. 1790)
 17 Pīr-ʿAlī claimant 1770–1805
 17 Īsh-Muḥammad (Īshīm) of the Kazakh Lesser Jüz 1794–1797
 17 Būkāy of the Kazakh Inner Jüz 1801–1815
 18 Jahāngīr Girāy of the Kazakh Inner Jüz 1823–1845
 19 Ṣāḥib Girāy of the Kazakh Inner Jüz 1845–1847
 17 Shighāy of the Kazakh Inner Jüz 1815–1823
 16 Yār-Muḥammad of the Kazakh Lesser Jüz 1786–1790
 16 Īr-ʿAlī of the Kazakh Lesser Jüz 1791–1794
 16 Aychuwāq of the Kazakh Lesser Jüz 1797–1805 (d. 1810)
 17 Jān-Tūra of the Kazakh Lesser Jüz 1805–1809
 18 Shīr-Ghāzī of the Kazakh Lesser Jüz 1809–1824 (d. 1845)
 10 Jādik
 11 Tūgum Kazakh claimant 1552–1556
 11 Shighāy of the Kazakhs 1580–1582
 12 Andān-Sulṭān
 13 Abūlī of Tashkent (d. 1650)
 13 Uraz-Muḥammad of Kasimov 1600–1611
 13 Kīchīk-Sulṭān
 14 Būkāy
 15 Khudāmanda
 16 Tursūn I of Tashkent (d.1717)
 17 Kīchīk-Sulṭān of the Kazakh Middle Jüz 1748–1750
 17 Sulṭān-Barāq of the Kazakh Middle Jüz 1748–1750
 12 Tawakkul (Tawka) of the Kazakhs 1582–1598
 12 Amān-Būlān
 13 Bahādur
 14 Tursūn II of Tashkent (d. 1720)
 15 Yulbārs of Tashkent and the Kazakh Greater Jüz 1720–1740
 12 Īsh-Muḥammad (Īshīm) of the Kazakhs 1598–1613, 1627–1628
 13 Khudābanda
 14 Sīrdāq
 15 Khusraw
 16 Qayʾip of the Kazakhs 1715–1718
 13 Jānī-Beg of the Kazakhs 1628–1644
 13 Jahāngīr of the Kazakhs 1644–1652
 14 Tawakkul-Muḥammad (Tawka) of the Kazakhs 1652–1715
 15 Pūlād of the Kazakhs 1718-1729
 16 Abu'l-Muḥammad of the Kazakh Middle Jüz by 1737–1748, 1750–1771
 15 Shāh-Muḥammad (Sameke) of the Kazakh Middle Jüz 1719–after 1734 (1737?)
 14 Walī
 15 Abūlī
 16 Jahāngīr of Tashkent (d. after 1717)
 16 Walī
 17 Abu'l-Manṣūr Abūlī (Ablai) of the Kazakh Middle Jüz 1771–1781
 18 ʿAbdallāh of the Kazakh Middle Jüz 1781–1782
 18 Walī of the Kazakh Middle Jüz 1782–1821
 19 ʿUbaydallāh of the Kazakh Middle Jüz 1821–1824 (d. 1852)
 18 Qāsim
 19 Kanāshīrīn (Kenesary Kasymov) (died 1847) 
 2 Sārīcha
 3 Kuyunchak
 4 Qutluq-Khwāja
 5 Tuy-Khwāja
 6 Tūqtāmīš of the Ulus of Orda 1379–, of the Golden Horde 1380–1395, 1398, of Sibir 1399–1406
 7 Jalāl ad-Dīn of the Golden Horde 1411–1412
 8 ? Beg-Ṣūfī claimant in Crimea 1419–1421 (identification disputed)
 9 Sayyid-Aḥmad II claimant in Crimea 1432–1437, Podolia 1433–1452 (d. 1465?) (identification disputed)
 7 Karīm-Bīrdī of the Golden Horde 1409, 1412–1413, 1414–1415 (d. 1417?)
 8 Sayyid-Aḥmad I of the Golden Horde 1416 (disputed identification)
 7 Kibak of the Golden Horde 1413–1414
 7 Jabbār-Bīrdī of the Golden Horde 1414–1415, 1416–1417
 7 Qādir-Bīrdī of the Golden Horde 1419–1420
 7 Kūchuk-Muḥammad claimant in Crimea 1421 
 4 Tūlāk-Tīmūr
 5 Janis
 6 Tāsh-Tīmūr claimant in Crimea 1395–1396 (d. after 1404)
 7 Ghiyāth ad-Dīn I of the Golden Horde 1416
 8 Ḥājjī Girāy I of Crimea 1433–1434, 1443–1444, 1449–1466
 9 Ḥaydar Girāy of Crimea 1456
 9 Nūr-Dawlat Girāy of Crimea 1466–1467, 1474–1475, 1476–1478; of Kasimov 1486–1490 (d. 1503)
 10 Satīlghan Girāy of Kasimov 1490–1506
 10 Jānay Girāy of Kasimov 1506–1512
 9 Manglī Girāy I of Crimea 1467–1474, 1475–1476, 1478–1514
 10 Muḥammad Girāy I of Crimea 1514–1523
 11 Ghāzī Girāy I of Crimea 1523–1524
 11 Bahādur Girāy of Astrakhan 1523
 10 Saʿādat Girāy I of Crimea 1524–1532 (d. 1539)
 10 Islām Girāy I of Astrakhan 1531–1532; of Crimea 1532 (d. 1537)
 10 Ṣāḥib Girāy I of Kazan 1521–1524; of Crimea 1532–1551
 10 Maḥmūd Girāy
 11 Ṣafāʾ Girāy of Kazan 1524–1531, 1533–1546, 1546–1549
 12 Ūtamīš Girāy of Kazan 1549–1551
 10 Mubārak Girāy
 11 Dawlat Girāy I of Crimea 1551–1577
 12 Muḥammad Girāy II of Crimea 1577–1584
 13 Saʿādat Girāy II of Crimea 1584 (d. 1587)
 14 Muḥammad Girāy III of Crimea 1610, 1623–1624, 1624–1627 (d. 1629)
 12 Islām Girāy II of Crimea 1584, 1584–1588
 12 Ghāzī Girāy II of Crimea 1588–1596, 1596–1608
 13 Tūqtāmīš Girāy of Crimea 1608
 13 ʿInāyat Girāy of Crimea 1635–1637
 12 Fatḥ Girāy I of Crimea 1596
 13 Dawlat Girāy
 14 ʿĀdil Girāy of Crimea 1666–1671
 12 Salāmat Girāy I of Crimea 1608–1610
 13 Bahādur Girāy I of Crimea 1637–1641
 14 Salīm Girāy I of Crimea 1671–1678, 1684–1691, 1692–1699, 1702–1704
 15 Dawlat Girāy II of Crimea 1688–1702, 1708–1713 (d. 1725)
 16 Fatḥ Girāy II of Crimea 1736–1737 (d. 1746)
 17 Salīm Girāy III of Crimea 1764–1767, 1770–1771 (d. 1786)
 16 Arslān Girāy of Crimea 1748–1756, 1767
 17 Dawlat Girāy IV of Crimea 1769–1770, 1775–1777 (d. 1781)
 18 Salīm Girāy
 19 Salīm Girāy
 20 Azamat Girāy
 21 Qādir Girāy (d. 1953)
 22 Azamat Girāy (d. 2001)
 23 Qādir Girāy (b. 1961)
 17 Shāhbāz Girāy of Bujaq 1787–1789 (d. 1793)
 16 Qīrīm Girāy of Crimea 1758–1764, 1768–1769
 17 Bakht Girāy of Bujaq 1789–1792 (d. 1801)
 16 Aḥmad Girāy
 17 Ṣāḥib Girāy II of Crimea 1772–1775 (d. 1807)
 17 Shāhīn Girāy of Crimea 1777–1782, 1783 (d. 1787)
 17 Bahādur Girāy II of Crimea 1782–1783; of Bujaq 1783–1787 (d. 1792)
 15 Ghāzī Girāy III of Crimea 1704–1707 (d. 1708)
 15 Qaplān Girāy I of Crimea 1707–1708, 1713–1716, 1730–1736 (d. 1738)
 16 Salīm Girāy II of Crimea 1743–1748
 17 Qaplān Girāy II of Crimea 1770 (d. 1771)
 15 Saʿādat Girāy IV of Crimea 1717–1724 (d. 1732)
 16 Ḥalīm Girāy of Crimea 1756–1758 (d. 1759)
 15 Manglī Girāy II of Crimea 1724–1730, 1737–1739
 15 Salāmat Girāy II of Crimea 1740–1743 (d. 1751)
 16 Maqṣūd Girāy of Crimea 1767–1768, 1771–1772 (d. 1781)
 13 Muḥammad Girāy IV of Crimea 1641–1644, 1654–1666
 13 Islām Girāy III of Crimea 1644–1654
 13 Mubārak Girāy
 14 Murād Girāy of Crimea 1678–1683
 13 Qīrīm Girāy
 14 Ḥājjī Girāy II of Crimea 1683–1684
 14 Saʿādat Girāy III of Crimea 1691
 13 Ṣafāʾ Girāy
 14 Ṣafāʾ Girāy of Crimea 1691–1692
 13 ʿĀdil Girāy
 14 Dawlat Girāy III of Crimea 1716
 12 Mubārak Girāy
 13 Jānī-Beg Girāy of Crimea 1610–1623, 1624, 1627–1635
 7 ? Beg-Ṣūfī claimant in Crimea 1419–1421 (identification disputed)
 8 Sayyid-Aḥmad II claimant in Crimea 1432–1437, Podolia 1433–1452 (d. 1465?) (identification disputed)
 7 Dawlat-Bīrdī of the Golden Horde 1428; claimant in Crimea 1421-1428
 6 ʿAlī
 7 Khudādād of the Golden Horde 1422–1425
 6 Ḥasan
 7 Ulugh Muḥammad of the Golden Horde 1430–1437; of Kazan 1437–1446
 8 Maḥmūd (Maḥmūdāq) of Kazan 1446–1462
 9 Khalīl of Kazan 1462–1467
 9 Ibrāhīm of Kazan 1467–1479
 10 ʿAlī (Ilhām) of Kazan 1479–1484, 1485–1487 (d. 1490)
 10 Muḥammad-Amīn of Kazan 1484–1485, 1487–1495, 1502–1518
 10 ʿAbd al-Laṭīf of Kazan 1496–1502 (d. 1517)
 10 Gawhar Shād, female regent of Kazan 1531–1533
 8 Qāsim of Kasimov 1452–1469
 9 Dāniyār of Kasimov 1469–1486
 8 Yaʿqūb, possibly ruled in Kasimov 1469–1471
 1 Kay-Tīmūr
 2 Abāy
 3 Nūmqān
 4 Qutluq-Tīmūr = ? Qutluq-Tīmūr named as rival of ʿAbdallāh Khan in 1361 by Ibn Khaldun
 5 Tīmūr-Beg = ? Ūljāy-Tīmūr of the Golden Horde 1368 (d. 1369)
 6 Tīmūr-Qutluq of the Golden Horde 1397–1398, 1398–1399
 7 Pūlād of the Golden Horde 1406–1409, 1409–1410
 7 Tīmūr of the Golden Horde 1410–1412
 8 Kīchīk Muḥammad of the Golden Horde 1434–1459
 9 Maḥmūd of the Golden Horde 1459–1465; of Astrakhan 1465–1471
 10 Qāsim I of Astrakhan 1471–1481
 10 ʿAbd al-Karīm of the Golden Horde 1481–1491; of Astrakhan 1481–1485, 1491–1493, 1494–1514
 11 ʿAbd ar-Raḥmān of Astrakhan 1533–1537, 1539–1545
 10 Jānī-Beg of Astrakhan 1514–1521
 11 Ḥusayn of Astrakhan 1521–1523, 1523–1526
 9 Aḥmad of the Golden Horde 1459–1481
 10 Sayyid-Aḥmad III of the Golden Horde 1481–1491
 11 Qāsim II of Astrakhan 1528–1531, 1532
 12 Yādigār-Muḥammad of Kazan 1552 (d. 1565)
 10 Murtaḍā of the Golden Horde 1481–1494; of Astrakhan 1485–1491, 1493–1494 (d. 1499)
 11 Āq-Kibak of Astrakhan 1532–1533, 1545–1546, 1547–1550
 12 ʿAbdallāh
 13 Muṣṭafā-ʿAlī of Kasimov 1573–1583
 11 Bīrdī-Beg
 12 Yāmghurchī of Astrakhan 1546–1547, 1550–1554
 10 Shaykh-Aḥmad of the Golden Horde 1491–1502; of Astrakhan 1527–1528
 11 Shaykh-Ḥaydar (of Astrakhan in 1537–1541?)
 12 Darwīsh-ʿAlī of Astrakhan 1537–1539, 1554–1556 (d. after 1558)
 10 Sayyid-Maḥmūd of the Golden Horde 1491–1502
 10 Bahādur
 11 Beg-Pūlād
 12 Sāyin-Pūlād of Kasimov 1567–1573, Russian Tsar as Semën Bekbulatovič 1574–1576 (d. 1616)
 9 Bakhtiyār-Sulṭān
 10 Shaykh-Awliyār of Kasimov 1512–1516
 11 Shāh-ʿAlī of Kasimov 1516–1519, 1537–1567; of Kazan 1519–1521, 1546, 1551–1552
 11 Jān-ʿAlī of Kasimov 1519–1532; of Kazan 1531–1533 (d. 1535)
 9 Yaʿqūb of Khwarazm 1461–1462 
 9 Jawāq (Chuwāq) of Khwarazm 1462
 10 Māngishlāq
 11 Yār-Muḥammad 1st Ashtarkhanid khan of Bukhara 1599–1600 (d. 1612)
 12 Jānī-Muḥammad (or Jānī-Beg) of Bukhara 1600–1603
 13 Bāqī-Muḥammad of Bukhara 1603–1606
 13 Walī-Muḥammad of Bukhara 1606–1611, 1611
 14 Rustam-Muḥammad rival at Balkh 1613 (d. after 1641)
 15 Muḥammad-Raḥīm
 16 ʿAbd-Allāh of Balkh 1711–1712
 17 Sanjar of Balkh 1712–1717
 15 Walī-Muḥammad
 16 Muḥammad of Balkh 1717–1720
 13 Dīn-Muḥammad
 14 Imām-Qulī of Bukhara 1611, 1611–1641 (d. 1642)
 14 Nadhr-Muḥammad of Bukhara 1641–1645 (d. 1651)
 15 ʿAbd al-ʿAzīz of Bukhara 1645–1681 (d. 1684)
 15 Subḥān-Qulī of Bukhara 1681–1702
 16 ʿUbaydallāh I of Bukhara 1702–1711
 16 Abu'l-Fayḍ of Bukhara 1711–1747
 17 ʿAbd al-Muʾmin of Bukhara 1747–1750
 17 (Daughter of Abu'l-Fayḍ) married Muḥammad-Ḥājjī-Sulṭān
 18 Abu'l-Ghāzī of Bukhara 1758–1789; Khiva 1767–1768 (d. 1796)
 16 Iskandar of Balkh 1681–1683
 17 Muḥammad-Muqīm of Balkh 1697–1707
 16 Abu'l-Manṣūr of Balkh 1683
 16 Ṣaddīq-Muḥammad of Balkh 1683–1686
 12 Tursūn-Muḥammad
 13 Muḥammad-Ibrāhīm possibly the ruler of Balkh in 1601
 5 Qutlū-Beg
 6 Shādī-Beg of the Golden Horde 1399–1407
 7 Ghiyāth ad-Dīn II of the Golden Horde 1421, 1423–1426
 8 Muṣṭafā claimant at Astrakhan 1431–1433; in the Ulus of Orda 1440–1446; of Khwarazm 1447–1464
 3 Mīnkāsar
 4 ʿAbdallāh of the Golden Horde 1361–1370
 5 Muḥammad-Sulṭān of the Golden Horde 1370–1379
 4 Tughluq-Khwāja
 5 Tawakkul = Tūlāk of the Golden Horde 1379–1380
 4 Āqmīl
 5 Chekre khan of Sibir and Bolghar 1413, of the Golden Horde 1415–1416
 4 Mamkī
 5 Sayyid-Aḥmad I of the Golden Horde 1416 (disputed identification)
 5 Altī-Qurtuqā
 6 Darwīsh of the Golden Horde 1417–1419

See also
 List of Khans of the Golden Horde

References

 Bennigsen, A., et al., Le Khanat de Crimée dans les Archives du Musée de Palais de Topkapı, Paris, 1978.
 Bosworth, C. E., The New Islamic Dynasties, New York, 1996.
 Bregel, Y. (transl.), Firdaws al-Iqbāl: History of Khorezm by Shir Muhammad Mirab Munis and Muhammad Riza Mirab Agahi, Leiden, 1999.
 Burton, A., The Bukharans: A Dynastic, Diplomatic and Commercial History 1550–1702, Richmond, 1997
 Desmaisons, P. I. (transl.), Histoire des Mongols et des Tatares par Aboul-Ghâzi Béhâdour Khân, St Petersburg, 1871–1874.
 Gaev, A. G., "Genealogija i hronologija Džučidov," Numizmatičeskij sbornik 3 (2002) 9-55.
 Howorth, H. H., History of the Mongols from the 9th to the 19th Century. Part II.1. London, 1880. 
 Jackson, P., The Mongols and the Islamic World, New Haven, 2017.
 Judin, V. P., Utemiš-hadži, Čingiz-name, Alma-Ata, 1992.
 May, T., The Mongol Empire, Edinburgh, 2018.
 Počekaev, R. J., Cari ordynskie: Biografii hanov i pravitelej Zolotoj Ordy. Saint Petersburg, 2010.
 Sabitov, Ž. M., Genealogija "Tore", Astana, 2008.
 Sabitov, Ž. M., "K voporosu o genealogii zolotoordynskogo hana Bek-Sufi," in Krim: vìd antičnostì do s'ogodennja, Kiev, 2014: 63-74.
 Sagdeeva, R. Z., Serebrjannye monety hanov Zolotoj Ordy, Moscow, 2005.
 Seleznëv, J. V., Èlita Zolotoj Ordy, Kazan', 2009. 
 Sidorneko, V. A., Monetnaja čekanka Krymskogo hanstva (1442–1475 gg.), Simferopol', 2016.
 Stokvis, A. M. H. J., Manuel d'Histoire, de Généalogie et de Chronologie de tous les États du Globe, depuis les temps les plus reculés jusqu'à nos jours, vol. 1, Leiden, 1888.
 Tizengauzen, V. G. (trans.), Sbornik materialov, otnosjaščihsja k istorii Zolotoj Ordy. Izvlečenija iz arabskih sočinenii, republished as Istorija Kazahstana v arabskih istočnikah. 1. Almaty, 2005.
 Tizengauzen, V. G. (trans.), Sbornik materialov otnosjaščihsja k istorii Zolotoj Ordy. Izvlečenija iz persidskih sočinenii, republished as Istorija Kazahstana v persidskih istočnikah. 4. Almaty, 2006.
 Vásáry, I., "The beginnings of coinage in the Blue Horde," Acta Orientalia Academiae Scientiarum Hungaricae 62 (2009) 371-385.
 Vohidov, Š. H. (trans.), Istorija Kazahstana v persidskih istočnikah. 3. Muʿizz al-ansāb. Almaty, 2006.
 Welsford, T., Four Types of Loyalty in Early Modern Central Asia: The Tūqūy-Tīmūrid Takeover of Greater Mā Warā al-Nahr, 1598-1605, Leiden, 2013.

Mongol Empire Muslims
Year of birth unknown